Bootlegs & G-Sides is a compilation album by rap group, 11/5. It was released on August 5, 1997 for Dogday Records and was produced by Premiere Music (Reggie "Reg" Smith, T.C. and Race). The album featured a variety of Bay Area Rappers including JT the Bigga Figga, Guce, Totally Insane and Skanless.

Track listing
"Keep It Real" - 3:22
"Playaz & Hustlaz" - 4:18 (Featuring Totally Insane)
"415 Reasons" - 4:55 (Featuring Cold World Hustlers)
"Mission Complete" - 3:12
"187-304" - 4:08
"Countin' Money" - 4:25
"44 Maggie" - 4:24 (Featuring Neighborhood Kingpinz, Spice 1)
"K.A.H." - 5:22 (Featuring U.D.I., Cold World Hustlers)
"Another Killin' Season" - 3:50
"Premeditation" - 5:04
"Scrilla, Scratch, Paper" - 4:56 (Featuring JT the Bigga Figga, Cougnut)
"Stack Gritz" - 4:01 (Featuring Guce)
"Garcia Vegas" - 2:30
"Money" - 4:50 (Featuring Skanless)
"Killahoe Pimp" - 3:31
"Sucka Free" - 4:10

11/5 albums
1997 compilation albums